Racket Squad is an American TV crime drama series that aired from 1951 to 1953.

The format was a narrated anthology drama, as each individual episode featured various ordinary citizens getting ensnared in a different confidence scheme.  Episodes were introduced and narrated by Reed Hadley as "Captain John Braddock", a fictional detective working for a police department in a large, unnamed American city.  Braddock served as the series' host and narrator.

Synopsis
The show dramatized the methods and machinations of con men and bunko artists. At episode's end, Captain Braddock gave viewers advice on how to avoid becoming the victim of the confidence game illustrated in the episode. Plots were based on actual case files from United States police departments, business organizations and other agencies.

In the original episodes, Braddock addressed the victim in the second person, addressing the victim directly. In later episodes he narrated in the more conventional third person. Shooting was rapid, with 44 pages of script shot in two days.

Production
The show originally was produced for the syndication market in 1950, was picked up by CBS in 1951, and ran on the network through 1953. The series was filmed at Hal Roach Studios in Culver City, California, and was sponsored by cigarette manufacturer Philip Morris. The shows were produced at a cost of $25,000 per episode, which was cheap for the time. Racket Squad finished at #30 in the Nielsen ratings for the 1951-1952 season.
 
Three episodes were combined and released as a feature film Mobs, Inc. in 1956.

Guest stars
The show featured several guest stars who would achieve starring roles in future film and television roles:

 Lola Albright (Edie Hart in Peter Gunn)
 Hugh Beaumont (Ward Cleaver in Leave It to Beaver)
 Mary Castle (Frankie Adams in Stories of the Century)
 Jan Clayton (Ellen Miller in Lassie)
 Jackie Coogan (Uncle Fester in The Addams Family), billed as "John L. Coogan"
 Will Geer (Grandpa Walton in The Waltons)
 Dayton Lummis (Marshal Andy Morrison in Law of the Plainsman)
 Eve McVeagh (Mildred Fuller in High Noon; Roberta—Lucy's Hairdresser in I Love Lucy and Frances Moseby in The Clear Horizon) 
 Carole Mathews (Wilma Fansler in The Californians)
 Ewing Mitchell (Sheriff Mitch Hargrove in Sky King)
 Noel Neill (Lois Lane in Adventures of Superman)
 John M. Pickard (Captain Shank Adams in Boots and Saddles)
 Gloria Saunders (The Dragon Lady in Terry and the Pirates)
 Karen Sharpe (Laura Thomas in Johnny Ringo)
 Robert Shayne (Inspector Henderson in Adventures of Superman)
 Frank Wilcox (oil executive John Brewster on The Beverly Hillbillies and Federal District Atty. Beecher Asbury in The Untouchables)

After Racket Squad, Reed Hadley starred from March 1954 to June 1955 in another crime drama on CBS, The Public Defender.

Episodes

Release
Alpha Video released various episodes on DVD Worldwide Distribution.

Reception

Notes

External links

Racket Squad  at CVTA

1951 American television series debuts
1953 American television series endings
1950s American crime drama television series
1950s American police procedural television series
1950s American anthology television series
Black-and-white American television shows
CBS original programming
English-language television shows
First-run syndicated television programs in the United States
Television shows set in San Francisco
American detective television series
Television shows filmed in California